Proprioseiopsis gallus is a species of mite in the family Phytoseiidae.

References

gallus
Articles created by Qbugbot
Animals described in 1989